Lake Hartwell is a man-made reservoir bordering Georgia and South Carolina and encompassing parts of the Savannah, Tugaloo, and Seneca rivers. Lake Hartwell is one of the Southeastern United States' largest recreation lakes. The lake was created by the construction of the Hartwell Dam, completed in 1962 and located on the Savannah River seven miles (11 km) below the point at which the Tugaloo and Seneca Rivers join to form the Savannah. The entire Hartwell "Project" contains 76,450 acres (309 km2) of land and water. I-85 bisects Hartwell Lake and makes the area easily accessible to visitors.

Background
The Flood Control Act of 17 May 1950 authorized the Hartwell Dam and Reservoir as the second unit in the comprehensive development of the Savannah River Basin. The estimated cost was $68.4 million based on 1948 price levels and preliminary designs. Full power pool was designed to be 660 feet above mean sea level.

At this elevation, the reservoir would extend  up the Savannah River to the confluence of the Tugaloo and Seneca Rivers; 41 miles up the Tugaloo to within approximately 2 miles of the existing Yonah Dam; 27 miles up the Seneca to the mouth of the Little River, South Carolina; 2 miles up the Little River to the Newry site; and 7 miles up the Keowee to the Old Pickens site. The reservoir would cover 56,500 acres and would involve the relocation of 3 sections of railroad totaling 2 miles, the raising of 2 railroad bridges, construction of 6 sections of new state high- ways, totaling 19.6 miles, and 9 sections of county roads totaling 12.7 miles; the construction of 9 new bridges and the raising of 4 existing bridges, and the relocation of 2 power transmission lines.

Construction of the Hartwell project took place from 1955 and was completed in 1963. Construction of the dam started in 1955 and was finished in 1959. Salvage archeological excavations were conducted at several sites in an effort to recover artifacts and information from prehistoric and historic sites that would be inundated by Lake Hartwell. Dr. Joseph Caldwell (archaeologist) led a team from the University of Georgia in this work, especially from 1957 to 1959.
Lake Hartwell is named for the American Revolutionary War figure Nancy Hart. Nancy Hart lived in the Georgia frontier, and was known for her devotion to freedom. A county, city, lake, state park and highway among others, bear her name.

Droughts and water levels of Lake Hartwell
1989 was the first year the lake hit a level 3, dropping to its lowest level during the drought that year. 2008 was the second time the lake hit a level 3. This revealed old highways that were typically underwater, exposed islands that are usually topped with buoys to warn boaters, and left some boat shells sitting on dry land.

The Lake reached its lowest level, on December 9, 2008. This rebound in lake level is due to releases from the lake being suspended for a month ending April 10, 2009, in an effort to return Lake Hartwell to normal elevations.

Early lake history
The area around Lake Hartwell has a rich history of indigenous settlement, dating to before the Mississippian culture period, which began about 800 CE. Numerous villages and platform mounds were built by people of that culture, along the upper tributaries of the Savannah River, such as the Chauga, Tugaloo, and Seneca rivers.

The Cherokee Indians settled throughout much of this Piedmont and mountainous area, declaring it their homeland. Initial relations with colonists were through trading, but after the Revolutionary War, European-American settlers increasingly encroached on Cherokee territory. They have since named many streams, rivers and recreation areas after the historic Cherokee and Muscogee Creek, who were among the Five Civilized Tribes removed from the Southeast under President Andrew Jackson in the 1830s.

Other historic figures who lived around this area were Andrew Pickens and John C. Calhoun, both statesmen from South Carolina. The botanist William Bartram traveled the area recording vegetation types and plant species.

Challenges to construction
In August 1956 Mrs. Eliza Brock and her daughter refused to allow workmen to come on their property to begin clearing for the reservoir area. The government had gained ownership of 103 acres of land in June 1956, but apparently Mrs. Brock never received the offer for her land. She refused to allow workmen on her property.  After an October 1956 federal ruling, Mrs. Brock settled on accepting $6,850 for her property.

In late 1956 Clemson College objected to damage that would be done to its property as a result of the impounded water in the reservoir. For instance, plans would cause the flooding of their  Memorial Stadium. After countless meetings, Clemson finally settled with the government, agreeing to two diversion dams to be built in the vicinity of Clemson College in order to rechannel the Seneca River around its property.

Fishing
Since its construction, Hartwell Reservoir has provided good fishing habitat for many species. Bream, catfish, smallmouth bass, walleye, and largemouth bass are naturally occurring species in the lake, with quality fishing available for those species. The most popular fishing on Lake Hartwell, however, has been of striped bass. Striped Bass, also known as rock fish and normally a saltwater fish, were discovered able to survive in freshwater after the construction of a dam on the Santee-Cooper system in lower South Carolina trapped many striped bass in fresh water. Striped bass were eventually introduced to the three lower Savannah River System lakes: Hartwell, Russel, and Thurmond. Fish heavier than  have been caught on Lake Hartwell, with  fish being common.

Recreation

Camping: there are 9 campgrounds at Lake Hartwell with a total of 524 campsites.
Trails: a   multi-purpose trail is in the Paynes Creek Campground area.
Fishing: many fish species inhabit Lake Hartwell, including largemouth bass, bream, hybrid and striped bass, crappie, white bass, trout, and walleye.
Swimming: the lake is considered suitable for swimming despite there have been over 200 deaths on the lake.
Water sport: activities such as tubing, water skiing, and wake boarding are permitted on the lake.
Boating: there are five marinas along the lake, including Clemson Marina, Big Water Marina, Harbor Light Marina, Hartwell Marina, and Portman Marina as well as many public boat ramps.
Wildlife: there are more than 250 species of birds and 40 different mammals around Lake Hartwell.

Places to visit 
 Issaqueena Dam. Located along the Keowee River, past Clemson, this dam has a waterfall about 25 feet tall and 150 feet wide, carrying overflow from Lake Issaqueena into Lake Hartwell. The waterfall is posted with danger signs, as some deaths have occurred here.

 Eighteen Mile Creek. Eighteen Mile Creek is a curvy and narrow waterway. It is off the Seneca River at buoy marker S-42. It is well known by fishermen and birders. The creek extends about five miles, ending in a big shallow area with an old bridge. It is a site of many birds and wildlife.
Rock Quarry. This has many overhanging rocks, whose height seems to change with varying lake levels. Some areas within this cove are shallower than others.
 Ghost Island. At its center high point are fifty old grave headstones; some cannot be read. Some above-ground concrete vaults are marked identifying the graves from the War of 1812. Others are from the 1700s. Many people camp on this island unaware of their "company".
 Andersonville Island. Andersonville, South Carolina was once a well-known port and resort town. It had a barge system with daily service to Savannah, Georgia. It flourished for years, attracting both industry and tourists. Andersonville was said to be as large as Anderson or Pendleton, both also in South Carolina. Today it survived only as a large island, nearly 400 acres. It is the largest island on the lake, and is between two and three miles long. A paved road across the island is grown over. Visitors can explore building ruins, artifacts, rare plants and wildlife.

See also
List of lakes in South Carolina

References

Sources

External links

 

Protected areas of Anderson County, South Carolina
Protected areas of Franklin County, Georgia
Protected areas of Hart County, Georgia
Protected areas of Pickens County, South Carolina
Reservoirs in Georgia (U.S. state)
Reservoirs in South Carolina
Protected areas of Oconee County, South Carolina
Protected areas of Stephens County, Georgia
Bodies of water of Anderson County, South Carolina
Bodies of water of Franklin County, Georgia
Bodies of water of Hart County, Georgia
Bodies of water of Pickens County, South Carolina
Bodies of water of Oconee County, South Carolina
Bodies of water of Stephens County, Georgia